This is a list of Academy Award winners and nominees from Belarus.

Best Actor in a Leading Role

Best Adapted Screenplay

Best Original Screenplay

Best Story

Best Original Score

Nominations and Winners

References 

Lists of Academy Award winners and nominees by nationality or region
Academy Award winners and nominees
Academy Award winners and nominees